Russia is a nation that has competed at the Hopman Cup tournament on seven occasions, their first appearance coming at the 13th annual staging of the event in 2001. They have won the tournament on one occasion, in 2007, and were the runners up two years later in 2009.

Before its dissolution, Russia used to form part of the Soviet Union which also competed at the Hopman Cup on two occasions in the early 1990s. Additionally, Russia is a member of the CIS which entered a team into the 1992 event.

Players
This is a list of players who have played for Russia in the Hopman Cup.

Results

1 In the 2007 final against Spain, the mixed doubles dead rubber was not played.
2 In the 2009 final against Slovakia, the mixed doubles dead rubber was not played.

See also 

 CIS at the Hopman Cup
 Soviet Union at the Hopman Cup

References

Hopman Cup teams
Hopman Cup